Special People may refer to:
 Special People (album), a 1980 album by American jazz drummer Andrew Cyrille
 Special People (film), a 2008 British film directed by Justin Edgar
 people with disabilities or with abnormal abilities